NKVD House is a constructivist building in Tsentralny City District of Novosibirsk, Russia. It was built in 1932. Architects: Ivan Voronov, Boris Gordeyev.

History
The residential building is located on Serebrennikovskaya Street. It was built for NKVD employees.

See also
 Polyclinic No. 1
 Dinamo Residential Complex
 NKVD House (Serebrennikovskaya Street 23)

References

External links
 Квартал чекистов. НГС.НОВОСТИ.

Tsentralny City District, Novosibirsk
Buildings and structures in Novosibirsk
Constructivist architecture
Residential buildings completed in 1932
Cultural heritage monuments of regional significance in Novosibirsk Oblast